Chilwell Road is a tram stop on the Nottingham Express Transit (NET) network, in the district of Broxtowe and town of Beeston. It is situated on street track within Chilwell Road, and has side platforms flanking the track, together with a traffic island between the tracks. Trams run at frequencies that vary between 4 and 8 trams per hour, depending on the day and time of day.

Chilwell Road stop opened on 25 August 2015, along with the rest of NET's phase two.

References

External links

Nottingham Express Transit stops
Transport in the Borough of Broxtowe
Beeston, Nottinghamshire